Khaled Mohammed (Khaled Mohammed Mohammed Saleh) - a Qatari footballer who plays as a midfielder for Qatar .
 Khaled Hussein (Khaled Hussein Mohamed al Tarhouni) - a Libyan football midfielder. As of the 2009–10 season, he plays for the Libyan Premier League club Nasr Benghazi. He is the captain of Nasr and has played in the first team for over 10 years.